Herr Puntila and His Servant Matti is a 1979 Finnish-Swedish drama film directed by Ralf Långbacka. The film was selected as the Swedish entry for the Best Foreign Language Film at the 53rd Academy Awards, but was not accepted as a nominee.

Cast
 Lasse Pöysti as Johannes Puntila
 Pekka Laiho as Matti Aaltonen
 Arja Saijonmaa as Eeva Puntila
 Martin Kurtén as Attaché Eino Silakka
 May Pihlgren as Dean's wife
 Sven Ehrström as Fredrik
 Rolf Labbart as Dairy manager
 Tauno Lehtihalmes as Dean
 Ritva Valkama as Emma Takinainen
 Elina Salo as Chemistry clerk
 Pirkko Nurmi as Liisu

See also
 List of submissions to the 53rd Academy Awards for Best Foreign Language Film
 List of Swedish submissions for the Academy Award for Best Foreign Language Film

References

External links
 
 

1979 films
1979 drama films
Films based on works by Bertolt Brecht
Finnish drama films
Swedish drama films
1970s Swedish-language films
1970s Swedish films